Andrew Tyler Griggs (born August 13, 1973) is an American country music artist. He has released three albums for RCA Records Nashville (You Won't Ever Be Lonely, Freedom, and This I Gotta See) and a fourth (The Good Life) for Montage Music Group. These four albums have accounted for 13 singles and 6 Top Tens on the Billboard country chart, the highest being "You Won't Ever Be Lonely" and "She's More", both of which peaked at #2. He also charted "Grow Young With You", a cut from the soundtrack to the film Where the Heart Is.

Biography
Griggs was born  in West Monroe, Louisiana. His father, Darrell, died when Griggs was 10, and brother Mason served as the family's father figure until he died of a heart attack at age 22.

He briefly attended Northeast Louisiana University before returning to his hometown in the early 1990s, where he became a youth minister and began a family with his wife. He continued to work on his musical skills, however, and by 1999, he signed to a contract with RCA Records Nashville.
Griggs has been married twice, first to Stephanie Sullivan in February 1995, but they were eventually separated.  In 2005 Griggs married Renee, but they also eventually separated. He now has a son named Mason.

Musical career
Griggs' debut album, You Won't Ever Be Lonely, was issued in 1999 via RCA Records Nashville. Certified gold by the RIAA, the album accounted for five singles on the Billboard country singles charts. The first three singles — the title track, "I'll Go Crazy" and "She's More" — were all Top Ten hits, peaking at number 2, number 10 and number 2 respectively. "You Won't Ever Be Lonely" also had the sixth-longest chart run on the country charts in the 1990s decade, spending thirty-six weeks on the charts. Following "She's More" was a non-album song, "Grow Young With Me", recorded as a duet with Coley McCabe, and after that, "Waitin' on Sundown" at number 50 and "You Made Me That Way" at number 19. Also included on the album was a duet with Griggs' idol Waylon Jennings in the track "Shine On Me", as well as a cover of Jennings' "Ain't Livin' Long Like This".

He released his second album, Freedom, in 2002. Although its lead-off single "How Cool Is That" peaked at number 22, the second single, "Tonight I Wanna Be Your Man", became his fourth Top Ten hit at number 7. Closing out this album was "Practice Life", a number 33 duet with Martina McBride.

For 2003 and half of 2004, Griggs was absent from the country charts, although he, Montgomery Gentry, and Blake Shelton performed uncredited guest vocals on Tracy Byrd's 2003 single "The Truth About Men". Mid-2004 saw the release of "She Thinks She Needs Me". Co-written by Shane Minor, this song was the first single release from Griggs' third album, This I Gotta See, also released in 2004. Although this song and follow-up "If Heaven" were both number 5 hits on the country charts, the album's third single, "This I Gotta See", stopped at number 58, and the fourth single ("I Never Had a Chance") failed to chart at all. By 2005, he had left RCA's roster, due to creative differences over his artistic control.

In 2007, Griggs signed to his second recording contract, this time with Montage Music Group. His first album for the label, The Good Life, produced two low-charting singles in "Tattoo Rose" (co-written by Cole Deggs, lead singer of Cole Deggs & the Lonesome) and "What If It's Me". Three years later, he issued "Can I Get an Amen".

Discography

Studio albums

Singles

Guest singles

Music videos

Notes

References

External links
 

1973 births
American country singer-songwriters
American male singer-songwriters
Living people
Singer-songwriters from Louisiana
RCA Records Nashville artists
Montage Music Group artists
People from West Monroe, Louisiana
21st-century American singers
Country musicians from Louisiana
21st-century American male singers